María Gloria Münchmeyer Barber (born September 2, 1938 in Santiago) is a Chilean television, film and theatre actress, known for her roles in some telenovelas like La Madrastra, Marrón Glacé, and others. She was married with the actor/comedian Jorge Guerra and mother of the actress Catalina Guerra. In 1990, she received the Volpi Cup for her role on La luna en el espejo.

Filmography

Films 
 Julio Comienza en Julio (1977)
 Imagen Latente (1988)
 La Luna en el Espejo (1990) - Lucrecia
 Coronación (2000)
 Padre Nuestro (2005)
 El Rey de San Gregorio (2005)
 El Regalo (2008) - Lucy
 El baile de la Victoria (2009)

Theatre 
 Los Deseos Concebidos (1982)
 Cielo Ciego (1998)
 Pecados, Confesiones de una Mujer (2005)

Series 

 Soltero a la Medida (1994)

 Tres son Multitud (2007) - Beatriz Rosas

 Los 80 (2010) - Leonor

External links
 

1938 births
Living people
Actresses from Santiago
Chilean people of German descent
Chilean film actresses
Chilean stage actresses
Chilean telenovela actresses
Chilean television actresses
Chilean women comedians
Volpi Cup for Best Actress winners